Louise Young is an author, historian of modern Japan, and professor at the University of Wisconsin-Madison. She received her B.A. from the University of Wisconsin-Madison, then her M.A. and Ph. D. from Columbia University.

She has acted as a visiting researcher to Tokyo University, Waseda University, and Kyoto University.

Books
Japan's Total Empire: Manchuria and the Culture of Wartime Imperialism (1998) (won the John K. Fairbank Prize and the Hiromi Arisawa prize)
Beyond the Metropolis: Second Cities and Modern Life in Interwar Japan (2013)

References

Living people
Columbia University alumni
University of Wisconsin–Madison alumni
University of Wisconsin–Madison faculty
Writers from Wisconsin
Year of birth missing (living people)